Dalton E. Gray (born June 4, 1997) is an American actor best known for his role as Mike in American Horror Story: Freak Show and Jack Colson for two seasons on HBO's Treme In 2012 Dalton made his film debut in the WWE Studios produced thriller film No One Lives. In 2014, Dalton played a young Harry Dunn, Jeff Daniels' character in Dumb and Dumber To. He also appeared in Revolution. Dalton graduated at the age of 16 from K12 in Texas. He was born and raised in Katy, Texas to Cary and Lynnette Gray and has one sister named Katie Gray.

Early life 
Gray was raised in Katy where he attended Katy Elementary, Katy Junior High, and one year at Katy High School then went on to graduate from K-12 at the age of 16.  Before Gray started acting he was a national level motocross winning over 200 1st place titles. After an injury and Gray being unable to race he decided to give acting a try.

Career 
In 2012 after a few short films, Dalton made his film debut in the WWE Studios produced thriller film No One Lives.  He then booked the role as Jack Colson son of New Orleans detective David Morse season 3 & 4 on HBO's Treme
Young Harry Dunn is played by Dalton Gray in the film  Dumb and Dumber To. In 2014 season of American Horror Story: Freak Show as Mike.

Filmography

Film

Television

Awards and nominations

Media 
Other articles and interviews.
http://www.artistdirect.com/entertainment-news/article/interview-ben-woolf-dalton-gray-talk-american-horror-story-freak-show-at-the-l-homme-de-maison-launch/11313090

References

External links 
 

Living people
American male voice actors
American male film actors
American male television actors
Male actors from Houston
21st-century American male actors
American male child actors
1997 births